Stanislav Bacílek (13 November 1929 in Kladno, Czechoslovakia – 26 March 1997) was a Czech ice hockey player who competed in the 1956 Winter Olympics.

References

1929 births
1997 deaths
Czech ice hockey defencemen
Ice hockey players at the 1956 Winter Olympics
Olympic ice hockey players of Czechoslovakia
Sportspeople from Kladno
Czechoslovak ice hockey defencemen